Belgium competed at the 2013 World Championships in Athletics in Moscow, Russia, from 10–18 August 2013.
A team of 17 athletes was announced to represent the country in the event.

Results
(q – qualified, NM – no mark, PB – personal best, SB – season best)

Men

Track and road events

Decathlon

Track and road events

Field events

Heptathlon

See also
Belgium at other World Championships in 2013
 Belgium at the 2013 UCI Road World Championships
 Belgium at the 2013 World Aquatics Championships

References

External links
IAAF World Championships – Belgium

Nations at the 2013 World Championships in Athletics
World Championships in Athletics
2013